Marcel Dupont (10 October 1917, Jupille – 6 March 2008, Blegny) was a Belgian professional road bicycle racer, who finished 5th place in the 1949 Tour de France.

Major results

1939
Herstal
1948
Malchamps
1949
Aachen
Tour de France:
5th place overall classification
1950
Roubaix–Huy

References

External links 

1917 births
2008 deaths
Belgian male cyclists
Sportspeople from Liège
Cyclists from Liège Province